Floris is a 1969 Dutch action television series starring Rutger Hauer and Jos Bergman, written by Gerard Soeteman, and directed by Paul Verhoeven.

Concept
The success of television series like the British Ivanhoe, the French Thierry La Fronde and the Flemish Johan en de Alverman inspired , manager of NTS (forerunner of NTR) to make a similar series, set in the Netherlands. It was written by Gerard Soeteman. The series was filmed in black and white, and has been aired in reruns through the years. It has also been shown in East Germany and (dubbed in English) in Scotland.

Storyline
In the early 16th century, during the Guelders Wars (1502-1543), the knight Floris van Roozemond (spelling varies with o/oo, s/z and d/dt), accompanied by the Indian Sindala (Bergman), returns home from a trip around the world only to find his castle occupied by Maarten van Rossum, the commander in chief of Charles, Duke of Guelders. Charles, who controls Guelders, is involved in a power struggle against Philip the Handsome who rules the Burgundian Netherlands, the rest of the Low Countries. Floris had so far been neutral due to his absence, but after he finds his castle stolen, he sides with Wolter van Oldenstein, who is allied with Burgundy against Charles. Charles and Maarten are aided by the Frisian pirate Greate Pier partly as an ally, and partly to do the dirty work.

Cast 
 Rutger Hauer ... Floris
 Jos Bergman ... Sindala
 Ton Vos ... Wolter van Oldenstein
 Jacco van Renesse ... Rogier
 Hans Culeman ... Maarten van Rossem
 Tim Beekman ... Sergeant 
 Pollo Hamburger ... Diederik
 Henk Admiraal ... Wilhelm
 Diana Dobbelman ... Ada
 Ida Bons ... Viola
 Hans Boskamp ... Lange Pier
 Sacco van der Made ... Aernout
 Nico Deegen ... Ubbe
 Peter Aryans ... Boer
 Frans Kokshoorn ... Molenaar
 Ad Hoeymans ... Barend van Hackfort 
 Niek Engelschman ... Zweden 
 Carola Gijsbers van Wijk ... Isabella
 Hans Kemna ... Govert
 Lex Schoorel ... Roland
 Eric Schuttelaar ... Wobbe
 Tony Verwey ... Waard
 Paul van Gorcum ... Priester
 Jan Apon ... Personal Physician 
of the Duke of Guelders

Historicity
Apart from Sindala and Floris, all the characters are based on historical figures. A divergence from history is the presence of the pirate Greate Pier: although a contemporary, he was not active as a pirate before the death of Philip the Handsome. In the series, Pier is either guarded or surrounded by members of the Arumer Zwarte Hoop (called "Gelderse Friezen" in the series).

Although intended as a children's series, it was very popular with adults; for example, Floris's sword fight with two swords in the castle in the first episode looks surprisingly realistic. The series also had an educational element: customs, like timekeeping with bells, and the origin of words such as vernagelen ('to spike down'), are explained by example. While Floris is portrayed as a typical knight-hero – not too bright but a good swordsman – Sindala is the clever one, using Oriental scientific knowledge for practical applications (which also had educational value).

Locations included the medieval castle of De Doornenburgh, close to Doornenburg in the Dutch province Gelderland (part of the historical Guelders), and the Belgian cities of Bruges and Ghent.

Production
Finding actors for the series was a problem because television was still regarded as inferior to the theatre. Hauer was introduced to Verhoeven as "maybe not such a good actor, but he will do and dare anything". Verhoeven was indeed worried by Hauer's lack of acting experience, but he looked good physically, could handle swords and ride horses well and did most of his stunts himself. The original name of the series was Floris and the Fakir and Verhoeven used two shot filming just in case. Hauer learned the TV acting fast enough.

For the time it was a major production with 80 actors and 2500 extras. Verhoeven overspent the budget of 355,000 guilders by more than 300% (the total production costs cannot be calculated exactly anymore, but are estimated to be ƒ1,200,000 or €545,000). When this became clear, it was already too late to stop the production because Verhoeven used "vertical planning", in which the filming was done per actor instead of per episode. Stopping the production would mean that all work was lost. As a TV production of this scale had never been done before in the Netherlands, there was a lot of pioneering. Recordings were usually made in the studio, but Floris was mostly shot outside. Everyone on the set, including Verhoeven, had to learn the trade as they went. Tasks were also not strictly delineated, like they are these days; everyone was a bit of a jack of all trades. "We didn't stand with our arms folded smoking a cigarette when it wasn't our turn." Ironically, finding good locations for this TV production was difficult because the popularity of television had resulted in transmitting antennas being ubiquitous.

Collaboration
The series was the first major undertaking of both Hauer and Verhoeven, as well as their first collaboration. It was followed by Turkish Delight (Turks Fruit) and Soldier of Orange (Soldaat van Oranje); ideas not used for the series were later included in the film Flesh and Blood, also directed by Verhoeven with Hauer in the lead role (which also proved to be their final collaboration).

Episodes
Het gestolen kasteel (The Stolen Castle)
 De koperen hond (The Copper Dog)
 De zwarte kogels (The Black Bullets)
 De man van Gent (The Man from Ghent)
 De harige duivel (The Hairy Devil)
 De vrijbrief (The Pass Papers)
 De drie narren (The Three Fools)
 De alruin (The Mandrake)
 Het brandende water (The Burning Water)
 De wonderdoener (The Miracle Man)
 De Byzantijnse beker: Het toernooi (The Byzantine Goblet: The Tournament)
 De Byzantijnse beker: De genezing (The Byzantine Goblet: The Healing)

Related media

Export
The series was sold for redubbing to channels in the UK and also to East Germany. In the UK, the series aired on Yorkshire Television in 1970 as The Adventures of Floris. None of the English dubbed episodes survive.

Audio plays
Two of the unproduced scripts were produced as audio plays; they seem to be the same adventures as #6 and #8 of the newspaper comic adventures and #7 and #10 of the German remake.

Text stories
Photo-illustrated text stories of two episodes were serialised in the short-lived comic magazine Jamin Junior during 1972. These were "De Wonderdoener" (Nummers 1–14) and "De Zwarte Kogels" (Nummers 15–26). As publication of Jamin Junior was terminated rather suddenly, it is believed the second adaptation remained unfinished.

Newspaper comics
Starting in 1972 15 scripts for the Floris series (not taken into production) were made into newspaper comics published in De Telegraaf by Gerrit Stapel. The art and dialogue were Stapel's, but the story Soeteman's, so the newspaper comics should be considered a canonical source of information about Floris's further adventures. Most important event in the comics is that Floris regains ownership of castle Rozenmondt in the 7th comics adventure.

German remake
1975 saw a West German remake of the series, Floris von Rosemund, again starring Rutger Hauer, but with German actor Derval de Faria as Sindala. This version, directed by Austrian director Ferry Radax, put much more emphasis on the comedic aspects of the stories and provided the female characters Ada and Viola with larger parts than the original. Strangely enough the East German dub of the original Dutch, black and white, series was made two years after this, in 1977.

DVD
The original series has been released on DVD, as has the German remake; neither edition has any other languages or subtitles. However, fan made English subtitles exist for the Dutch series and all of its documentaries.

Film adaptation

The movie Floris (2004) was shot in 2003. It was directed by Jean van de Velde and features Michiel Huisman as the grandson of the original Floris. The new side-kick is Pi, a role played by pop star Birgit Schuurman. Some of the footage from the 1969 series with Hauer and Bergman is included. Hauer was originally asked to play the father of young Floris, but he declined.

Recovery of unfinished episodes
Some material had been filmed for two episodes which were never completed after the project was ended: Het Gericht (the tribunal), and De Bouwmeester (The Architect). The former's screenplay had been used for the German remake as well. In 2016 the raw footage was found. While The architect amounted to only a few minutes, The tribunal was assembled, and ran just over 18 minutes when linked with panels from the newspaper comic strip and narration where necessary to make up for the missing material. It was then shown at Doornenburg Castle, one of the old locations. All the material of both unfinished episodes was later made available online through a regional Guelders broadcaster.

References

External links

 
 
 
 
 

1969 Dutch television series debuts
1969 Dutch television series endings
Dutch drama television series
Dutch children's television series
1960s Dutch television series
Dutch-language television shows
Television series set in the 15th century
Television shows adapted into films
Television shows adapted into comics
Black-and-white Dutch television shows
Television shows set in the Netherlands
Adventure television series
Fictional knights
Fictional Dutch people